Villiers-le-Mahieu is a commune in the Yvelines département in the Île-de-France region in north-central France.

Monuments
 Château de Villiers-le-Mahieu: 13th century castle, rebuilt in the 17th century and now a luxury hotel.

See also
Communes of the Yvelines department

References

Communes of Yvelines